Mure is an extinct language of Bolivia. It was long considered a Chapacuran language, but the similarities are few, and are likely loans, as the Mure were missioned together with speakers of Chapacuran languages. Apart from those few words, the languages are "utterly different" according to Glottolog, a view that is shared by Birchall (2013).

The Mure lived in the Jesuit Missions of Moxos. They mostly resided in San Simón Mission, with some also living in San Francisco de Borja Mission together with the Movima. Neighbors of the Mure included the Rokorona.

Texts
Mure is attested only by a few surviving texts of the Lord's Prayer, Hail Mary, and Nicene Creed. The texts have been analyzed by Georges de Crequi-Montfort and Paul Rivet (1913).

The texts below are reproduced from Teza (1868). Interlinear analyses are adapted from de Crequi-Montfort & Rivet (1913), with the original French glossing also included.

Pater Noster
The Lord's Prayer:

Analysis:

{|
| Kore-papa||matičiko||vua-n-apina;||sciri-kiti-kakayo||vua-nataa||mi-vee;
|-
| Seigneur||||au-ciel;||que-nous-honorions||ici-bas||ton-nom;
|-
| Our father||||in heaven||that we honor||here below||your name
|}

{|
| vi-kiti-scianka||mi-reyno (rei-);||sciri-kiti-tietaa||me-papala||huači-mesno,
|-
| qu’il-vienne||ton-royaume;||que-nous-fassions||ta-volonté||
|-
| come||your kingdom||that we do||your will||
|}

{|
| otičana||vua-n-apina.||Sera-me-vuae||miri-manovoh-tate||vire;||miri-kiakaravua-
|-
| comme||au-ciel.||nos aliments||donne||aujourd’hui;||pardonne
|-
| as||in heaven||our food||give||today||forgive
|}

{|
| nate||sere-pekato-vuae,||otičana||sereri-vuae||sera-sci-kiakaravua-ko velene;
|-
| ||nos-péchés,||comme||nous||nous-pardonnons;
|-
| ||our sins||as||we||we forgive
|}

{|
| miri-takami-tate||pekato,||miri-takami-tate||taskakae||lapena.||Amen.
|-
| délivre||péché||délivre||||mal.||Amen.
|-
| deliver||sin||deliver||||evil||Amen.
|}

Ave Maria
The Hail Mary:

Analysis:

{|
| Ave Maria||ne-takoko||grasia,||Dios||ne-neyta,||koni||tana-skaka||ne-
|-
| Salut Marie||toi-pleine||grâce,||Dieu||toi-avec,||||femmes||toi-
|-
| Ave Maria||||grace||God||with you||||women||you
|}

{|
| rememe-ko,||čane||rememe-na||neka||Jesus.||Santa Maria,||ve-mama||Dios,
|-
| bénie,||aussi||béni,||ton-fils,||Jésus,||Sainte Marie,||mère||Dieu,
|-
| blessed||also||blessed||your son||Jesus||Saint Mary||mother||God
|}

{|
| sereri-vuae||sere-lapeta||miri-takataa-tate||vire,||čane||sere-tami-vah-tay.||Amen.
|-
| nous||nous-méchants||prie||aujourd’hui,||aussi||notre-mort.||Amen.
|-
| we||we sinners||pray||today||also||our death||Amen.
|}

Nicene Creed
The Nicene Creed (adapted):

Analysis:

{|
| Scipalohnaa||Dios||apa||kare-neemipina||vua-tiemao||vua-n-apina||čane au;
|-
| Je-crois||Dieu||père||tout-puissant||sur-terre||au-ciel||aussi
|-
| I believe||God||father||almighty||on earth||in heaven||also
|}

{|
| scipalohnaa||sere papa-vuae||Jesu-Kristo||pastokte||veka||Dios,||otireere-
|-
| je-crois||notre-||Jesus-Christ||unique||son-fils||Dieu,||
|-
| I believe||our||Jesus Christ||only||son||God||
|}

{|
| neko||parih||virgen||Santa Maria,||vuatieo||espiritu santo||ti-komateo,||tami-
|-
| ||||vierge||Sainte Marie,||||Esprit Saint||par-l’œuvre,||il-
|-
| ||||virgin||Saint Mary||||Holy Spirit||by the work||he
|}

{|
| makakarara-koo||ti-mamiko||Poncio Pilato,||tala-nateo||kruzu,||tami-va-koo,
|-
| souffrit||par-l’ordre||Ponce Pilate,||fut-mis||croix,||mourut,
|-
| suffered||by the command||Pontius Pilate||was placed||cross||died
|}

{|
| kisciloh-nateo,||tami-nakaspave-koo kesno;||tovona||raare||tami-ra-hoo,||tami-
|-
| fut-enterré,||descendit||jours||trois||il-resta,||il-
|-
| was buried||descended||days||three||he stayed||he
|}

{|
| navo-koo,||tami-me-koo||vua-n-apina;||otipasseko||v-itnañuh||ve-papa||kare-
|-
| ressuscita,||il-monta||au-ciel;||||à-la-droite||père||tout-
|-
| resurrected||he ascended||to heaven||||on the right||father||all
|}

{|
| neemipina;||huay||vua-tiaki||tami-mapoymiaki||ve-pekato-vuae||reerene||kavee,
|-
| puissant;||de||là||il-viendra||péchés||||vivants,
|-
| almighty||of||here||he will come||sins||||living
|}

{|
| aba-ke.||Scipalohnaa||espiritu santo,||santa iglesia katholika,||ve-komunio
|-
| morts.||Je-crois||Esprit Saint,||sainte église catholique,||communion
|-
| dead||I believe||Holy Spirit||Holy Catholic Church||communion
|}

{|
| santo-vuae,||vevake||pekato,||tami-ra-tay,||tami-navo-tay||aba-ke,||tami-vua-
|-
| saints,||pardon||péché,||||résurrection||morts,||
|-
| saints||forgive||sin||||resurrection||dead||
|}

{|
| olala-tay||remena||kristiano||vepassakano||Dios||tapalapala-tay.||Amen.
|-
| ||bons||chrétiens||||Dieu||||Amen.
|-
| ||good||Christian||||God||||Amen.
|}

Basic vocabulary
Mure basic vocabulary items selected from the glossed interlinear texts above:

{| class="wikitable"
! gloss !! Mure
|-
| three || raare
|-
| sky || apina
|-
| earth || tiemao
|-
| days || tovona
|-
| name || vee
|-
| 1.P || sere-
|}

References

Language isolates of South America
Languages extinct in the 1910s
Mamoré–Guaporé linguistic area